Kaarel is an Estonian masculine given name. It is a cognate of the North Germanic names Karl and Carl and the French and English Charles.

Kaarel may refer to:

Kaarel Eenpalu (1888–1942), Estonian journalist, politician and former Prime Minister of Estonia
Kaarel Heinver (1886–1961), Estonian politician
Kaarel Ird (1909–1986), Estonian actor and theatre director
Kaarel Kais (born 1974), Estonian volleyball player
Kaarel Kiidron (born 1990), Estonian football defender
Kaarel Kilvet (1944–2005), Estonian actor, singer and director
Kaarel Kübar (1907–2004), Estonian sport shooter
Kaarel Kurismaa (born 1939), Estonian artist
Kaarel Liidak (1889–1945), Estonian agronomist and politician  
Kaarel Liimand (1906–1941), Estonian painter
Kaarel Lukk (1887–1970), Estonian racewalker
Kaarel Nurmsalu (born 1991), Estonian ski jumper and combined skier 
Kaarel Orviku (born 1935), Estonian marine geologist and nature photographer
Kaarel Parts (1873–1940), Estonian lawyer, judge and politician
Kaarel Pürg (born 1949), Estonian politician
Kaarel Robert Pusta (1883-1964), Estonian politician and former Minister of Foreign Affairs of Estonia
Kaarel Tarand (born 1966), Estonian journalist and editor
Kaarel Zilmer (born 1947), Estonian skier and coach

See also

Kaarle

References

Estonian masculine given names